Yoon Seung-ah (born September 29, 1983) is a South Korean actress. She debuted as a magazine model, and first gained attention in 2006 by appearing in two music videos by Alex Chu and Ji Sun. After finishing her art major, Yoon pursued an acting career, with supporting roles in the television series Playful Kiss and Moon Embracing the Sun. She was cast in her first leading role in the 2012 cable romantic comedy Miss Panda and Mr. Hedgehog.

Career
After being discovered on the street, Yoon Seung-ah began her career as a model, appearing in the magazines CeCi, Elle Girl Korea, Vogue Girl Korea and Cosmopolitan Korea and landing exclusive contracts with Nivea and J.Estina.

Yoon first caught the public's eye in 2006 in Alex Chu and Ji Sun's music videos for "Very Heartbreaking Words" and "I Love You", and received the moniker of "Snail Girl." She waited to finish her art major in college before debuting, and gave up a chance to study art abroad in order to pursue her acting career. Supporting roles in films and TV series followed, notably as Ha-ni's quirky best friend Min-ah in romantic comedy Playful Kiss, and as slave-turned-swordswoman Seol in the hit period drama Moon Embracing the Sun.

In 2012, she landed her first leading role in Channel A rom-com series Miss Panda and Mr. Hedgehog, playing a cake shop owner opposite Super Junior's Lee Donghae. Later that year, Yoon hosted the fashion reality show Sold Out on cable channel OnStyle.

Personal life
After a romantic tweet that actor Kim Mu-yeol meant to be a private message to Yoon was accidentally posted on his Twitter page, their agencies confirmed in February 2012 that the two were dating. Yoon and Kim married on April 4, 2015.

In December 2022, their agency announced that Yoon is pregnant with the couple's first child and expected to give birth in June 2023.

Filmography

Television series

Film

Variety show

Music video

References

External links

1983 births
Living people
21st-century South Korean actresses
South Korean television actresses
South Korean film actresses
People from Gwangju